The Left Shoe Company, previously Left Foot Company, was a made-to-measure male footwear manufacturer with offices in London, Los Angeles and in Helsinki. The company was founded in 1998 as The Left Foot Company. It was renamed and rebranded The Left Shoe Company in the fall of 2010 and filed for bankruptcy in 2016.

Business model 
Because of the Made to measure 3D scanning method the shoes are available in a wide range of sizes and more personalized models. Normally, tailor made high quality shoes come at a high price, the delivery is around six months and the customer must revisit the shoemaker frequently. In contrast, 3D measured shoes can be delivered in 6 weeks.

The company – or its retailers – does not carry any inventory or overhead. This puts The Left Shoe Company in the same retail market as regular Ready-to-wear shoes with the exception that they are made-to-measure

Once the 3D-scanning process is completed, the customer is able to individualize his choice of shoes in accordance with the made-to-measure term, both in the store and on the website he can choose the sole, colour and leather to his liking.

The Left Shoe Company received recognition from management guru C. K. Prahalad in his book The New Age of Innovation.

The Left Shoe Company unfortunately didn't make it and filed for bankruptcy in 2016. Carter Clark from Essex in the UK is the curator. In the US the company filed for Chapter 7 bankruptcy on May 10, 2016.

In the UK it's in the process of liquidation since July 18, 2016.

References

External links and media articles 
Official webpage
Article in Financial Times: The Shoe that is sure to fit
Article about The Left Shoe Company in Forbes
Chapter 7 filed in the US May 10, 2016
Liquidation in process in the UK since July 18, 2016

Defunct companies based in London
Clothing companies established in 1998
Shoe companies of the United Kingdom